Pacific Reserve Fleet, Alameda was a part of the United States Navy reserve fleets, also called a mothball fleet, that was used to store the many surplus ships after World War II. The Pacific Reserve Fleet, Alameda was part of the former Naval Air Station Alameda in Alameda, California, in the San Francisco Bay. Some ships in the fleet were reactivated for the Korean War and Vietnam War.

The site today is the USS Hornet Museum, home of the  that opened in 1998 and, from 1976, home of the Ready Reserve Fleet, of the Ready Reserve Force, managed by United States Maritime Administration (MARAD).

Ready Reserve Fleet Alameda ships
United States Maritime Administration's Ready Reserve Fleet Alameda ships:
 GTS Adm Wm M. Callaghan (T-AKR-1001)
 MV Cape Orlando (T-AKR-2044)
 SS Gem State (T-ACS-2)

 SS Keystone State (T-ACS-1)

Past ships
SS Algol (T-AKR-287)
SS Capella (T-AKR-293)
MV Cape Orlando (T-AKR-2044)
 SS Grand Canyon State (T-ACS-3)

See also
 List of Ready Reserve Force ships
 U.S. Navy museums (and other aircraft-carrier museums)
 List of aircraft carriers of the United States Navy
 List of maritime museums in the United States

References

External links
 Official page USS Hornet Museum and Aircraft Carrier Hornet Foundation

1946 establishments in California
Pacific Reserve Fleet, Alameda